Karen Roberts (born June 16, 1954) is an American luger. She competed in the women's singles event at the 1976 Winter Olympics.

References

External links
 

1954 births
Living people
American female lugers
Olympic lugers of the United States
Lugers at the 1976 Winter Olympics
People from Miles City, Montana
21st-century American women